Serena is a 1962 black-and-white, British B film crime thriller directed by Peter Maxwell and stars Patrick Holt, Emrys Jones and Honor Blackman. The title of the film is the name of one of the characters, Serena Vaughan, who may have figured in a murder. Serena was part of a double bill and was later released to the home media market with Impact (1963), also directed by Peter Maxwell.

Plot
Detective Chief Inspector Gregory (Patrick Holt) from Scotland Yard, and his partner, Sergeant Conway (Bruce Beeby), are called in to investigate the shotgun murder of a woman at Rosehill Cottage, a remote Surrey cottage. The victim appears to be Ann Rogers (Honor Blackman), the wife of womanising artist Howard Rogers (Emrys Jones). Her face, however, is so badly disfigured by the two shotgun blasts, it is hard to be sure of her identity. Rogers looks for a birthmark that would positively prove the body belongs to his wife, but it is not there.

At first, Gregory had considered Rogers as the chief suspect, but his alibi proves he is innocent. When Ann suddenly shows up, the identity of the murdered woman may rest on her friend, Claire Matthews, who is missing. A search for both the artist's mistress, Serena Vaughan, and the missing woman, intensifies, but Ann's motivations are also suspect. One of the women may know the truth.

Cast

 Patrick Holt as Inspector Gregory 
 Emrys Jones as Howard Rogers 
 Honor Blackman as Ann Rogers 
 Bruce Beeby as Sergeant Conway 
 John Horsley as Mr. Fisher 
 Robert Perceval as Bank Manager 
 Wally Patch as Barman 
 Gerry Duggan as Norman Cole 
 Peter Glaze as Station Booking Clerk 
 Howard Greene as River Police Sergeant 
 Reginald Hearne as Doctor 
 Lawrence James as Uniformed Constable 
 Benedicta Leigh as Policewoman Scott 
 Barry Linehan as Forensic Chemist 
 Bill Mills as Photographer 
 Frank Pettitt as Fred 
 Colin Rix as Plainclothes Detective
  Raymond Smith as River Police Constable
  Pat Shaw as Uniformed Policewoman

Production
Principal photography on Serena took place on location in Surrey, and at Shepperton Studios, Shepperton, Surrey, England.

Critical reception
TV Guide gave Serena two out of five stars, calling it a "Basic programmer with a plot more clever than most"; while the Radio Times rated it three out of five stars, and wrote, "Rising well above the quota-quickie average, this entertaining little whodunnit shoehorns an extravagant amount of plot into its short running time. Directed at a fair lick by Peter Maxwell"; and Allmovie called the film an "interesting mystery."

In a 2004 review, John Pym described Serena as "stagey" and, "(a)... not very taxing mystery."

References

Notes

Bibliography

 Pym, John, ed. Time Out Film Guide. London: Time Out Guides Limited, 2004. .

External links
 

1962 films
British crime thriller films
Films directed by Peter Maxwell
1960s crime thriller films
Films shot in Surrey
1960s English-language films
1960s British films